Helmut Krawinkler (April 6, 1940 – April 16, 2012) was an Austrian-born American structural engineer.

Krawinkler was a native of Innsbruck, Austria, born on April 6, 1940. He earned an undergraduate degree from the Vienna University of Technology in 1964. Krawinkler then completed a master's degree at California State University San Jose, funded by a Fulbright Scholarship between 1965 and 1967. In 1971, he graduated from the University of California, Berkeley with a doctorate and became an assistant research engineer at Berkeley. After a year as lecturer at California State University, Krawinkler joined the Stanford University faculty in 1973. 

He directed the Blume Earthquake Engineering Center from 1985 to 1995.
He was appointed John A. Blume Professor within the  Department of Civil and Environmental Engineering in 1991. Krawinkler was granted emeritus status in 2007. He was elected to the United States National Academy of Engineering in 2012 "for development of performance-based earthquake engineering procedures for evaluating and rehabilitating buildings." 

That same year, Krawinkler was diagnosed with a brain tumor that necessitated surgery performed in February 2012. He died in Palo Alto, California, on April 16, 2012, while seeking further treatment.

References

1940 births
2012 deaths
Engineers from Innsbruck
Austrian emigrants to the United States
Members of the United States National Academy of Engineering
TU Wien alumni
San Jose State University alumni
University of California, Berkeley alumni
American structural engineers
Stanford University faculty
20th-century American engineers
21st-century American engineers